27 Dresses is a 2008 American romantic comedy film directed by Anne Fletcher, written by Aline Brosh McKenna, and starring Katherine Heigl and James Marsden. The film was released in Australia on January 10, 2008, and in the United States on January 18.

Plot
Jane Nichols has been a bridesmaid for twenty-seven weddings. One night when she is attending two weddings almost simultaneously, she meets Kevin Doyle, who disgusts her with his cynical views of marriage. Kevin and Jane share a cab home, where she forgets her day planner. Kevin snoops through the planner and resolves to return it to Jane. Meanwhile, Jane's sister Tess returns from a trip to Europe and quickly falls in love with Jane's boss George, on whom Jane has an unrequited crush. Tess feigns interest in George's passion for the outdoors and animal rights, and their courtship progresses rapidly. Soon, they announce plans to marry in only three weeks. Tess enlists Jane to be the wedding planner.

Tess and George's nuptials will be featured in the newspaper's Commitments section. The reporter turns out to be Kevin, who writes wedding announcements under the pseudonym Malcolm. Kevin successfully returns Jane's planner but decides to use the contents as material for a piece on the "perennial bridesmaid" as a stepping stone to more serious journalistic pursuits. Jane is unaware of Kevin's intentions. During their interview about Tess's wedding, Jane shows him the 27 bridesmaids' dresses in her closet. He takes pictures of her wearing all 27 dresses and submits the photos and his article about Jane for publication. As Kevin and Jane grow closer, he has second thoughts and begs his editor to hold off on publishing the article.

Kevin accompanies Jane on a wedding-related errand in Rhinebeck, New York. When Jane's reckless driving causes the car to skid off the road and become stuck, the two seek refuge at a local bar, and enjoy drunken revelry while singing "Bennie and the Jets". Kevin and Jane kiss and have sex in the car. That day, Kevin's editor runs the article about Jane on the front page of the Commitments section. Jane is betrayed and is furious at Kevin. Tess then gets angry at Jane for giving Kevin material about her, whom he describes as a bridezilla. The fight escalates when Jane learns that Tess altered their late mother's wedding dress to make her own gown (which Jane wanted for herself), the last straw on Tess's string of lies to George and demands on Jane.

Despite the fight, Tess still asks Jane to make a slideshow for her engagement party. Jane exacts her revenge by sharing pictures of Tess flirting with other men in the past, eating ribs, and holding a cat by the tail - in short, illustrating her numerous lies to George. After Pedro, the child that George mentors, reveals that Tess had him cleaning George's apartment for money, George breaks off the engagement.

Later at work, George tells Jane that he appreciates her because she never says no. Remembering that Kevin once said the same thing as criticism, Jane quits and admits she only stayed at the job because she was in love with George. She discovers after an experimental kiss that she no longer loves George. She finds Kevin at a wedding he is covering and announces her love for him.

One year later, Jane and Kevin are getting married. George and Tess meet at the ceremony and hope for a second chance. All 27 brides serve as Jane's bridesmaids, wearing the dresses that she once wore as their bridesmaid.

Cast

Production
Principal photography began on May 10, 2007. The film was primarily shot in the state of Rhode Island. Locations included Rosecliff and Marble House mansions, a beach in Charlestown, East Greenwich, and Providence. Filming also took place during two weeks in New York City.

Catherine Marie Thomas was in charge of Costume design. Director Anne Fletcher worked told her she wanted "big, ugly and bright -- every color palette, every style". Thomas came up with fifty potential dresses and with Fletcher decided which twenty seven would be in the film.
Several of the dresses were made by designer DeBora Rachelle.

Release

Box office
The film opened at number two at the North American box office, earning US$23 million in its opening weekend behind Cloverfield. 27 Dresses grossed $76.8 million in North America, and $85.8 million in international markets, for a total worldwide gross of $162.6 million.

According to BoxOfficeGuru.com, "The audience for the $30M-budgeted 27 Dresses was overwhelmingly female. Studio research showed that 75% of the crowd consisted of women, but the audience was evenly split between persons over and under 25."

Critical response 

On Rotten Tomatoes 41% of critics gave the film positive reviews based on 154 reviews, with an average rating of 5/10. The website's critics consensus reads, "The filmmakers perfectly follow the well-worn romantic comedy formula, rendering 27 Dresses clichéd and mostly forgettable." On Metacritic the film had an average score of 47 out of 100, based on 31 reviews. Audiences polled by CinemaScore gave the film an average grade of "B+" on an A+ to F scale.

Cath Clarke of The Guardian said that despite Heigl's "knack for light comedy, and an easy good grace," she felt the script "fails to find satire on the can't-miss territory of the Manhattan wedding circuit", saying "What a maddening waste of Katherine Heigl this insipid romantic comedy is." Peter Howell from the Toronto Star said the film "shamelessly trades in the hoariest of chick-flick clichés" and criticized screenwriter Aline Brosh McKenna for filling the script with "cheap gags" instead of the "savage wit and genuine insight into the shallowness of modern life" she had in The Devil Wears Prada.

Home media

The Blu-ray Disc and DVD was released on April 29, 2008, in the United States and July 29 in the United Kingdom.

Soundtrack
The film features a score written by Randy Edelman along with numerous songs from other artists. These songs do not appear on the soundtrack CD, which includes only the Edelman score.

 "Born to Fight" – Tracy Chapman
 "Peace Train" – Cat Stevens
 "Valerie" - Mark Ronson featuring Amy Winehouse
 "I Don't Want to Be" – Gavin DeGraw
 "Over and Over" – Tim McGraw
 "Anticipation" – Carly Simon
 "Change of Heart" – Cyndi Lauper
 "Cherry-Coloured Funk" – Cocteau Twins
 "Who Knows" – Natasha Bedingfield
 "Unfair" – Josh Kelley
 "Hips Don't Lie" – Shakira
 "Lady West" – Jamie Scott and The Town
 "The Sky Is Crying" – Albert King
 "Freckle Song" – Chuck Prophet
 "Anna" – Bad Company
 "Bennie and the Jets" – Elton John
 "Under The Influence" – James Morrison
 "Happy Together" – The Turtles
 "Big Bounce" – Dick Lemaine
 "So Here We Are" – Bloc Party
 "Love Has Fallen On Me" – Chaka Khan
 "Be Here Now" – Ray LaMontagne
 "Like a Star" – Corinne Bailey Rae
 "Don't Stop 'Til You Get Enough" - Michael Jackson

References

External links

 
 
 

 

2008 films
2008 romantic comedy films
2000s English-language films
20th Century Fox films
American romantic comedy films
Dune Entertainment films
Films about dresses
Films about sisters
Films about weddings in the United States
Films directed by Anne Fletcher
Films produced by Roger Birnbaum
Films scored by Randy Edelman
Films set in New York City
Films shot in New York City
Films shot in Rhode Island
Films with screenplays by Aline Brosh McKenna
Spyglass Entertainment films
2000s American films